Dudley and Walsall Mental Health Partnership NHS Trust was an NHS trust set up in October 2008. It provides mental health services across Dudley and Walsall, West Midlands, England. It runs Dorothy Pattison Hospital and Bloxwich Hospital in Walsall, and Bushey Fields Hospital in Dudley.

The trust merged with Black Country Partnership NHS Foundation Trust on 1 April 2020 to form Black Country Healthcare NHS Foundation Trust.

History 
 
In December 2013, it was announced that the Trust would be among the first to trial the Care Quality Commission’s planned approach to inspecting mental health services because Monitor and the NHS Trust Development Authority wanted assurance on the quality of the services they provide before progressing their Foundation Trust applications.

The Trust, together with Black Country Partnership NHS Foundation Trust, has set up a  Liaison and Diversion service. The intention is that, "When someone in a police station, or involved in court proceedings, has a mental health problem or other vulnerabilities, they are referred to the right services and are given support and guidance based on their needs."

It merged with Birmingham Community Healthcare NHS Foundation Trust and Black Country Partnership NHS Foundation Trust in October 2017.  The new organisation will have an annual turnover of around £440 million – making it the third biggest mental health trust in England.  Most of the staff and services at will be transferred to Birmingham Community Healthcare. The remainder will become an integrated care provider which is expected to have a 15 year contract with Dudley Clinical Commissioning Group for community physical and mental health services, primary care, and some public health services.

Performance
In 2016 the Care Quality Commission rated the trust as requiring improvement, but after a further inspection it was rated good in 2017.

It was named by the Health Service Journal as one of the top hundred NHS trusts to work for in 2015.  At that time it had 948 full-time equivalent staff and a sickness absence rate of 5.4 per cent. 62 per cent of staff recommend it as a place for treatment and 54 per cent recommended it as a place to work.

Services 
Dudley and Walsall Mental Health Partnership NHS Trust offers numerous services including:
 Community mental health services for children, adults and older people
 Inpatient services for adults and older people
 Primary care mental health services
 Mental health social care services (via local authority partnerships)
 Psychological therapies
 Substance misuse services
 Employment, education and training support for people with mental health problems
 Specialist deaf services children and adolescents

See also

 List of NHS trusts
 Healthcare in West Midlands

References

Defunct NHS trusts